Probus: International Journal of Latin and Romance Linguistics is a peer-reviewed academic journal of Latin and Romance linguistics, published by de Gruyter Mouton. Its editor-in-chief is Leo Wetzels (Vrije Universiteit).

External links 

Linguistics journals
Publications established in 1989
Multilingual journals
Biannual journals
De Gruyter academic journals